Shimelis Adugna is an Ethiopian diplomat and official who was the former president of the Ethiopian Red Cross Society. He developed and strengthened the Society’s ability to respond to disaster and humanitarian needs.  He served as the Vice President of the International Federation of Red Cross and Red Crescent Societies for Africa and as national coordinator for Jobs for Africa, an employment generation and poverty reduction program of the International Labour Organization and the United Nations Development Program.

Shimelis also served as minister of labour and social affairs; ambassador to the Republic of India; vice-minister of the Interior in charge of correctional institutions; and as an independent consultant and government advisor on issues of famine, demobilized soldiers, and orphans.

Awards
Shimelis Adugna was awarded the Henry Dunant medal for outstanding humanitarian service, the highest award given by the International Red Cross Red Crescent Movement. He received the medal for "his personal commitment, his important contribution to the development of humanitarian activities and his work in promoting the Movement’s Fundamental Principles and ideals."

References

Year of birth missing (living people)
Government ministers of Ethiopia
Ambassadors of Ethiopia to India
Living people